Des Moines Police Department may refer to:

 Des Moines Police Department (Iowa)
 Des Moines Police Department (Washington)